2 Mics & the Truth is the fifth live album by American rock band Violent Femmes. The album was released on July 7, 2017, by Add It Up Productions and PIAS Recordings. It was recorded at various radio stations and Paste Magazine. It was released on CD, 2-LP and digital download/streaming with differing track listings on each format.

Track listings

The 2-LP release track listing is the same as the digital release, except for omitting the track "Issues".

Personnel
 Gordon Gano – lead vocals, guitar, banjo, fiddle
 Brian Ritchie – acoustic bass guitar, vocals
 John Sparrow – BBQ, cajón, vocals
 Blaise Garza – baritone saxophone, cabasa, vocals

 Jeff Hamilton - mandolin, guitar, ukulele, vocals
 Mike Kasprzak - percussion, vocals
 Tony Trischka - Banjo on "Add it Up", "Jesus Walking on the Water", and "Country Death Song"
 Dan Nosheny - Tuba on "Gone Daddy Gone" and "You Move Me"
 Billy Ficca - cajón on "Run with It"

References

2017 albums
Violent Femmes albums